Duo (London) 1993 is a live album featuring performances by saxophonists Anthony Braxton and Evan Parker which was recorded at the Bloomsbury Theatre as part of the 1993 London Jazz Festival and released on the Leo label.

Reception

The Allmusic review by Brian Olewnick stated "A live duo performance by musicians of this extraordinarily high caliber occasionally results in something incredible but perhaps more often describes a battle of egos with neither side giving in. In this case, the participants appeared willing to compromise and to some extent lay aside their commitment to the vast and idiosyncratic musical structures that they had developed over the year. If the recording still fails to live up to impossibly high expectations, it is nonetheless a fine album on its own merits".

Track listing
All compositions by Anthony Braxton and Evan Parker.
 "ParkBrax ≠ 1" – 14:26
 "BraxPark ≠ 2" – 6:24
 "ParkBrax ≠ 3" – 7:09
 "BraxPark ≠ 4" – 9:36
 "ParkBrax ≠ 5" – 9:59

Personnel 
Anthony Braxton – alto saxophone, sopranino saxophone
Evan Parker – tenor saxophone, soprano saxophone

References

Leo Records live albums
Anthony Braxton live albums
Evan Parker live albums
1993 live albums